Church of the Purification of the Blessed Virgin Mary - is an Orthodox church in Staropyshminsk village, Sverdlovsk oblast.

The building was granted the status of regional significance on the 10th of March 2011 (the Sverdlovsk oblast Government Decree No. 207). The object number of cultural heritage of regional significance is 661710842510005.

History 
The Pyshminsky plant related to the Cathedral of The Great Martyr Saint Catherine parish in Yekaterinburg until 1765. After the arrival of the Beryozovsky plant the independent parish was founded in 1809. The same year the church building was laid. The first church building and the bell tower were wooden. The funds for construction were allocated from the donations of the Perm diocese. Also the manager Ivan Gavrilovich Shevkunov donated money to church building. On the 9th of February 1810 the building was consecrated in honor of the Purification of the Blessed Virgin Mary by Father John Popov.

By 1844 the parish included Stanovaya and Sarapulka villages.

In 1882 the construction of a new stone building began. On the 5th of July 1887 the temple was consecrated by the Ekaterinburg bishop Nathaniel in honor of the Purification of the Blessed Virgin Mary. The wooden church was not dismantled, it remained ascribed. By 1904 the church parish had almost 2300 parishioners. The clergy of parish consisted of a priest and a psalm-reader.

In 1938 the building of a wooden church burned down. The stone building continued working until 1941. On the 7th of March 1941 the church was closed (the decision of Sverdlovsk Regional Executive Committee No. 633). Later there was a Youth club.

Architecture 
It is located in the central part of the village. The church has Russian-Byzantine art features. It is distinguished by the monumental composition.

The building is made of stone. The main part of the building is octagonal with a semicircular altar. From the western part there are a refectory and a wide porch. In the center the bell tower stands.

The walls of the church are decorated on the joints with pilasters between which is a complex multi-brass cornice. The keeled arches are also attached to the portals and framing of the lower windows. The upper windows on the northern and southern sides are doubled, inscribed in semicircular arches.

The church is crowned with a large bulbous head on a drum-eight. Elements of decoration of the refectory and porch are similar to the church ones.

References

Literature 
 
 
 

Tourist attractions in Sverdlovsk Oblast
Cultural heritage monuments of regional significance in Sverdlovsk Oblast
Churches in Sverdlovsk Oblast
Russian Orthodox church buildings in Russia